Aralia elegans is a species of plant in the family Araliaceae. It is endemic to China.

References

 Aralia elegans at The Plant List

elegans
Endemic flora of China
Vulnerable plants
Plants described in 1953
Taxonomy articles created by Polbot
Taxobox binomials not recognized by IUCN